Alec Jenkins (born 7 July 1987 in Wales) is a Welsh rugby union player who plays on the wing for  Llanelli Scarlets and Wales Sevens.

When not playing for the Scarlets, Jenkins plays domestic rugby with Llanelli RFC. Jenkins' former clubs include Pontyberem RFC and Carmarthen Quins. He has previously represented the Wales Sevens team and was part of the squad that won the Hong Kong Sevens Plate in April 2006. He has further representative honours for Wales at U18 & U19 levels.

In February 2007, Jenkins was included in the Wales U20 squad ahead of the U21 Six Nations championship. He appeared in every game of the tournament and scored a try in the 56-8 victory over Scotland.

Jenkins was called up for the Wales Sevens squad for the 2006–07 season, for the fifth and six legs of the IRB Sevens World Series in Hong Kong and Adelaide. He scored a try in the Plate final in Hong Kong against Argentina; the Welsh lifted the trophy courtesy of the 26-19 scoreline.

In January 2008, Jenkins was included in the Wales Sevens squad for the Wellington, New Zealand, and San Diego, USA, legs of the 2007–2008 IRB Sevens World Series.

On 14 May 2008 it was announced that Jenkins would be leaving the Scarlets to join London Welsh. On 1 July 2009 it was announced that Jenkins was returning to Wales to play for semi-professional side Neath RFC.

References

1987 births
Living people
Welsh rugby union players
Rugby union wings
Scarlets players
London Welsh RFC players
Llanelli RFC players
Neath RFC players